Reid Laurence "Larry" LaLonde (born September 12, 1968), also known as Ler LaLonde, is an American musician best known as the guitarist for Primus, a position that he has served since 1989, where he is known for his experimental accompaniment to the bass playing of bandmate Les Claypool. Previously, he played guitar for several groups including Possessed and Blind Illusion. He also has collaborated more recently with artists such as Serj Tankian and Tom Waits.

Biography

Early career 
LaLonde was born in Oakland, California. Originally inspired by guitarists such as Frank Zappa, Snakefinger, East Bay Ray, Jerry Garcia, Jimi Hendrix, and his teacher Joe Satriani, LaLonde eventually became interested in early thrash metal bands such as Metallica and Slayer. LaLonde formed his first band in high school, a speed metal band called Blizzard. LaLonde left the band later on to join the first generation death metal band Possessed. Possessed's landmark first album, Seven Churches, was released in 1985 when LaLonde was just 17 years old. According to LaLonde, he earned the nickname "Ler" at a young age because his friends were too lazy to say his middle name in its entirety.

After Seven Churches, Possessed released the Beyond the Gates album and The Eyes of Horror EP before breaking up in 1987. LaLonde then joined experimental thrash metal band Blind Illusion, appearing on the 1988 album The Sane Asylum, through which he became friends with bassist Les Claypool. At around the same time LaLonde was also a member of Corrupted Morals, with whom he recorded the album Cheese-It, released the following year. At the start of 1989, LaLonde left Blind Illusion and Corrupted Morals when Claypool invited him to reform the funk metal outfit Primus, which had been on hiatus since original guitarist Todd Huth left the previous year.

Primus 

With LaLonde on board, together with drummer Tim Alexander, Primus released their first album, the live Suck on This, in 1989, followed by the studio album Frizzle Fry in 1990. In 1991, came their major label debut Sailing the Seas of Cheese. The band's next studio album, Pork Soda, arrived in 1993 and landed in the Billboard Top 10. Tales from the Punchbowl followed in 1995, featuring one of Primus's most well-known songs, the single "Wynona's Big Brown Beaver," which was nominated for the 1996 Grammy for "Best Hard Rock Performance." Alexander left Primus in 1996 to be replaced by Bryan Mantia, and the group released two more albums, Brown Album in 1997 and Antipop in 1999, before going on hiatus in 2000.

In 2002, Primus returned from their hiatus with Claypool and LaLonde reuniting with Alexander, releasing the DVD/EP Animals Should Not Try to Act Like People in 2003 and the Hallucino-Genetics live DVD in 2004. On October 17, 2006, Primus released both their first greatest hits CD They Can't All Be Zingers and their third DVD Blame It on the Fish: An Abstract Look at the 2003 Primus Tour de Fromage.

In 2010, early Primus drummer Jay Lane rejoined the group, and they released the free June 2010 Rehearsal digital EP. A new album, titled Green Naugahyde, was released on September 13, 2011.

Other projects 

Interviewed by Zorak, LaLonde guest-starred in the live-action/animated talk show Space Ghost Coast to Coast on Cartoon Network.

During the Primus hiatus, LaLonde formed the experimental alternative band No Forcefield with Bryan Mantia, releasing two albums between 2000 and 2002.

In 2007 and 2008, LaLonde toured with Serj Tankian and the F.C.C. in support of the album Elect the Dead. Two live tracks featuring LaLonde were later released on the digital EP Lie Lie Live. Throughout 2011, he recorded several tracks for the 2012 game Twisted Metal.

Playing style 
Known for his technical proficiency as a guitar player, LaLonde uses many advanced guitar techniques such as pinch harmonics, sweep picking, pick tapping, volume swells and tapping, as well as other extended techniques in his music. His influences include funk, world music, heavy metal and film music. Melodically his playing makes heavy use of tritone intervals, the whole tone scale and the diminished scale, helping establish Primus’ hard, dissonant, dark sound.

Personal life 
In addition to being Primus' guitar player, LaLonde is also an avid skateboarder. He was the skater who knocked the nachos out of Bob Cock's hand in the music video for "Jerry Was a Race Car Driver".

LaLonde is married to Shane Stirling, who was a model on the CBS television show "The Price Is Right".

Discography

Possessed
1985: Seven Churches
1986: Beyond the Gates
1987: The Eyes of Horror

Blind Illusion
1988: The Sane Asylum

Corrupted Morals
1989: Cheese-It

Primus

1989: Suck on This (live)
1990: Frizzle Fry
1991: Sailing the Seas of Cheese
1992: Miscellaneous Debris (EP)
1992: Cheesy Home Video (VHS)
1993: Pork Soda
1995: Tales from the Punchbowl
1997: Brown Album
1998: Rhinoplasty (EP)
1998: Videoplasty (VHS)
1999: Antipop
2003: Animals Should Not Try to Act Like People (DVD/EP)
2004: Hallucino-Genetics: Live 2004 (DVD)
2006: They Can't All Be Zingers (compilation)
2006: Blame It on the Fish: An Abstract Look at the 2003 Primus Tour de Fromage (DVD)
2010: June 2010 Rehearsal (EP)
2011: Green Naugahyde
2014: Primus & the Chocolate Factory with the Fungi Ensemble
2017: The Desaturating Seven
2022: Conspiranoid (EP)

with Tom Waits
1999: Mule Variations
1999: Jack Kerouac Reads On the Road
2006: Orphans: Brawlers, Bawlers & Bastards

No Forcefield
2000: Lee's Oriental Message
2001: God is an Excuse

with Serj Tankian
2008: Lie Lie Live (EP)

References

External links
 
 Lalonde's 1998 Primus Guitar Rig. GuitarGeek.com

1968 births
Living people
American heavy metal guitarists
Musicians from Oakland, California
Primus (band) members
Lead guitarists
Guitarists from California
Possessed (band) members
Blind Illusion members
20th-century American guitarists
21st-century American guitarists